Arthur Engel (1855-1935) was a French archaeologist and numismatist, a member of the French Society of Numismatics and the Society of Antiquarians. He was also a member of the French Schools in Rome and Athens. With Raymond Surrure (1862–99), he wrote Traité de numismatique du moyen âge.

Selected publications
 Recherches sur la numismatique et la sigillographie des Normands de Sicile et d'Italie, 1882
 Numismatique de l'Alsace, 1887
 Répertoire des sources imprimées de la numismatique française, 1887-1889
 Traité de numismatique du Moyen âge, 1891-1905
 Fouilles exécutées aux environs de Séville, in Revue archéologique XVII, 1891, p. 87-92
 La nécropole romaine de Carmona, avec G. Bonsor, Revue archéologique XVII, 1891, p. 385-389
 Quelques collections espagnoles, 1891
 Rapport sur une mission archéologique en Espagne (1891), 1893
 Nouvelles et correspondance d'Espagne, Revue archéologique XXIX, 1896, p. 204-229
 Une forteresse ibérique à Osuna, fouilles de 1903, avec P. Paris, in Nouvelles Archives des missions scientifiques et littéraires 13, 1906

References 

1935 deaths
1855 births
French archaeologists
French numismatists